is an original Japanese anime series produced by Studio VOLN, directed by Gorō Taniguchi and written by Kazuki Nakashima. The series aired from January to June 2021.

Plot

The people of Lingalind revere the wall as a god, believing that all of existence is contained within and that the wall protects and provides for its inhabitants. While the land consists of several territories, it is mostly dominated by two powerful nations: The , which values intelligence and diplomacy, and The , which values honor and strength. These two nations are in constant conflict with each other over obtaining land and  capsules, which are sent from an unknown location once per month and land in predetermined regions of Lingalind, containing provisions and weapons that the people of Lingalind consider gifts from the wall. A Briheight's appearance and abilities are tied to one's , the thing they believe in above all else. Conviction is also recognized as an energy that flows throughout the world, powering various forms of advanced technology found within Lingalind and granting some people special abilities outside of operating a Briheight. Being defeated in battle while controlling a Briheight causes the user to disappear.

One day after a Rakuho is recovered by Rekka forces, a previously unheard-of second Rakuho lands in Edger Village on the outskirts of Lingalind's Iki region. Inside is an amnesiac young man whose only memory is that he is from "beyond the wall." Taking the name "Back Arrow," he seeks to journey back over the wall to restore his memory, entangling himself in the conflict between the two nations.

Production and release

The original anime television series was announced on December 28, 2019 and is produced by Studio VOLN. The series is directed by Goro Taniguchi and written by Kazuki Nakashima. Kōhei Tanaka composed the music and character designs are done by Shinobu Ohtaka and Toshiyuki Kanno. The series aired from January 9 to June 19, 2021, with the series running for two cours (seasons). The opening theme is "dawn" performed by LiSA, while the ending theme is  performed by Shuka Saitō. The second opening theme is  performed by Eir Aoi, while the ending theme is "United Sparrows" performed by FLOW. Funimation licensed the series and is streaming it on its website in North America and the British Isles, in Europe through Wakanim, and in Australia and New Zealand through AnimeLab. On April 22, 2021, Funimation announced the series would receive an English dub, with the first two episodes premiering the next day. Following Sony's acquisition of Crunchyroll, the series was moved to Crunchyroll.

Notes

References

External links
Official website 

2021 anime television series debuts
Anime with original screenplays
Aniplex
Crunchyroll anime
Mecha anime and manga
Tokyo MX original programming